HMS Andromache was a 28-gun sixth rate launched in 1832. She was assigned to the North America and West Indies Station, based at the Imperial fortress colony of Bermuda in 1838.

 She was converted to a powder hulk in 1854 and was broken up in 1875.

She took William Napier to China and participated in the war with China at Canton in 1834.

References

External links
 

Sixth-rate frigates of the Royal Navy
Corvettes of the Royal Navy
Victorian-era corvettes of the United Kingdom
1832 ships